is a theme park in Nagoya, Japan. It opened on April 1, 2017. It is the first Legoland  theme park in Japan; the second in Asia, after Legoland Malaysia Resort; and the eighth worldwide. The park was projected to attract over two million visitors annually.

History
On June 30, 2014, Merlin Entertainments announced plans to open a LEGOLAND Resort in Nagoya. Construction officially began on April 15, 2015.

With a budget of US$250 million, construction was implemented by Art and Project, TAA Group, and Tejix.

The park is located in Nagoya's Minato Ward, has over 40 attractions on the nine-hectare site, (22.24 acres), and uses approximately 17 million bricks. The attraction “Imagination Celebration” was completed on March 12, 2017. Cityscapes of places like Tokyo and Nagoya were created with LEGO plastic bricks in the theme park on March 17, 2017.

On March 27, 2017, a commemorative Lego-themed train began running on the Nagoya Rinkai Rapid Transit Aonami Line to celebrate the park's opening.

The commuter train, named LEGOLAND Train, began daily service on the Nagoya Rinkai Rapid Transit's Aonami Line, traveling from central Nagoya to the new theme park. LEGOLAND Japan's Divisional Director Torben Jensen commented on the newly developed LEGOLAND Train. “Today, I am extremely honored to be able to introduce the LEGOLAND Train, the only one of its kind in the world in Nagoya, after plans for it were put into motion nearly three years ago,” said Jenson. He also credited the city of Nagoya and the Aonami transit line for their support.

LEGOLAND Japan is the eighth Lego park location in seven countries across the world. The theme park has seven areas to explore and over 40 attractions and shows.

The Central Transportation Bureau of the Ministry of Land, Infrastructure, and Transportation announced that it approved buses of three companies to serve the park. The outdoor LEGO-themed park was shown to the media before its April 1, 2017 opening. The theme park offered an annual passport, and if purchased before April 2017, an early preview day would be included.

Merlin Entertainments announced plans to build a LEGOLAND Hotel and a Sea Life aquarium next to the park in 2018 to help transform the area into a resort, which was expected to cost 10 billion yen.

On December 1, 2017, LEGOLAND Hotel began accepting reservations for its April 2018 grand opening. The Sea Life Aquarium's grand opening was set for April 15, 2018  and LEGOLAND Japan Hotel opened on April 28, 2018.

On February 28, 2020, the park was closed due to the COVID-19 pandemic. The park reopened on March 23, 2020, with short business hours, staff wearing masks, and temperature checks.
The LEGOLAND Japan theme park initially was planned to reopen on March 16, 2020, but reopened Monday, March 23, 2020, out of caution due to the outbreak. However, not all services were available. LEGO Ninjago Live, the Observation Tower, Submarine Adventure, The Coral Reef buffer, and Knight's Table restaurant were not in operation. Merlin's Sea Life aquarium in Nagoya was also scheduled to reopen Monday, March 23, 2020. A statement released on behalf of LEGOLAND Japan regarding the implementation of safety measures to combat the pandemic stated: "To prevent the spread of infection and the safety and health of our guests and staff, we will strengthen measures against COVID-19 in accordance with the guidelines from administrative authorities and medical experts, but we will continue to ask each and every guest to cooperate so that children and their families can spend their time safely in the resort."

Park locations 

LEGOLAND is located away from the mainland with three different ways to access the park: by bus, by train, and by automobile. The park provides guest transportation to those who are needing wheelchairs and offers stroller rentals. On arrival at the park, there is a waiting area for entry. Entering LEGOLAND Japan, visitors are welcomed with large art works and sculptures of LEGO creatures and life-size animals. Observation Tower is located at the center of the entrance, allowing visitors to oversee the park. Walking by LEGOLAND's iconic sign, there are colorful buildings scattered around the resort, including restaurants and shops.

Themed areas of discovery within the resort include:

Bricktopia 
This building is designed to offer several activities, workshops, and programs. The area includes robotic workshops where children of all ages can learn to program and build their own robots. Within Bricktopia, there is Build and Test and the LEGO Creative Workshop. LEGO NINJAGO Live offers guests a state-of-the-art 4D interactive experience. Other interactive Bricktopia attractions include DUPLO Play, DUPLO Express, Imagination Celebration, and Observation Tower. The Chicken Diner offers chicken meals and sandwiches and PINO Cart offers Pino ice cream in a LEGO souvenir box.

Miniland 
At the center of the park, Miniland features many popular tourist attractions in Japan built from LEGO bricks, including locations from Tokyo, Osaka, Kyoto, and Nagoya. Over 10,496,352 LEGO bricks were used to recreate the coast-to-coast locations.

Adventure 
The Adventure area includes interactive games and maze-like areas for children's play. It is located on the east side of the park, where underwater attractions and adventures are located. Rides such as Submarine Adventure, S.Q.U.I.D. Surfer, Cargo Ace, and Beetle Bounce are found here. A restaurant, the Coral Reef Pizza and Pasta Buffet is in this area, as are the Artifact Shop, The Sub Shop, and Oasis Snacks.

LEGO City 
LEGO City is on the park's north side, with fun activities for the children and family to do together, like the Junior Driving School where children learn to drive an electric car and receive a driver's license at the end of the ride. Coast Guard HQ allows the driver to take the wheel in a gentle and relaxing boat ride. Besides showing children how to drive, the Rescue Academy offers a fun experience where teamwork is needed to put out fires. The resort also has a LEGO Cinema where everyone is welcome to watch LEGO movies. LEGO City has various places to visit such as the Studio Store, Heartlake Shop, and City Shop, each shop with a different theme. There are also three places to buy snacks or lunch, Pit Stop Juice ‘n’ Drive, Brick House Burgers, and Marina Snack Shack.

Knight's Kingdom 
The Knight's Kingdom is found on the park's northwest side and creates the feeling of traveling back in time. The medieval land includes attractions like the roller coasters The Dragon and Dragon's Apprentice, which accommodate younger children. There are also fun activities to do such as Merlin's Flying Machines, Merlin's Challenge, and Kingdom Games. Shops include King's Market as well as the Knight's Table Restaurant.

Pirates Shores 
Pirate Shores is the land of the Pirates surrounded by water. Fun activities include Splash Bottle, Castaway Camp, Archors Away!, and Blue Coat Games. The Lost Booty Trading Post is a gift shop offering souvenirs, and Walk the Plank Snacks offers a place to refuel.

Factory 
The Factory is located on the park's west south side. The LEGO Factory Tour is located in the heart of the resort's Factory area. The LEGO story displayed on the walls shares its history with park visitors as they walk through the factory corridors. On display is machinery that creates the various LEGO pieces seen throughout the park. At the tour's end, visitors each receive a new LEGO piece from the production line as a souvenir. All photos taken in the park can be picked up at The Photo Shop, which offers an original photo album with a LEGOLAND album limited edition. The Corner Shop provides stroller and wheelchair rental services and sells sundries and other useful goods. Souvenirs purchased in the park can be left here to be picked up upon leaving the park. Other shops in the area include The Big shop, Ice factory, and Factory Sandwich Company.

Rides and attractions
The theme park includes several rides as well as a miniature town that includes landmarks such as Tokyo Station, Kiyomizu Temple in Kyoto and Nagoya Castle. The park is divided into seven zones: Factory, Bricktopia, Pirate Shores, Knight's Kingdom, Adventure, LEGO City, and Miniland.  Most rides were imported, installed and modified to meet Japanese regulations by Sansei Technologies, Inc. Since the opening of the LEGOLAND Japan resort in 2017, there have been new rides and attractions opening up over the years. These attractions include LEGO Ninjago World, LEGOLAND Hotel, and Sea Life Aquarium.

Roller coasters

Amusement rides

Other attractions

Sea Life Nagoya 

Sea Life Nagoya (ja: シーライフ名古屋, Si Laifu Nagoya) is a Public aquarium located on the 1st and 2nd floors of the LEGOLAND Japan Hotel. It opened on April 15, 2018. The hall is divided into 11 sections, including an exhibition with the theme of the Kiso River and a "Ryugu Castle" zone with the theme of the fairy tale Urashima Taro. Also, since it is a part of LEGOLAND Japan Resort, there is an exhibition related to Lego blocks and seafood. Admission is set separately from LEGOLAND Japan. Sea Life Nagoya is the second Sea Life in Legoland, which opened after Sea Life Aquarium in LEGOLAND California. The emphasis is on experiencing, including backyard tours where you can actually interact with animals.

Facilities
Shoaling Ring
Kiso River
Rockpools
Harbour
Seahorse Nursery
Coral Reef
Stingray Bay
Jellies
Sunken Shipwreck
Ryugu-castle (Under Water tunnel)
Amazing Creations

Access
The park is close to Kinjō-futō Station on the Nagoya Rinkai Rapid Transit Aonami Line.

Stores 
LEGOLAND Japan Resort offers 12 stores, located in different areas of the park. Although these stores have different themes, guests are able to pick any type of Lego they want.

Restaurants 
The resort offers six restaurants, with most restaurants based on the area's theme. The family restaurants also offer entertaining activities for meal guests, providing families with feelings of welcome and the resort's luxury.

Creative Workshop 
The resort has a Creative Workshop that offers types of workshops such as Daruma doll crafting, Tensegrity, and Caterpillar. The workshops are open for all ages except for Tensegrity. Each workshop has a designated difficulty level.

See also
 2017 in amusement parks

References

External links
 
 

Legoland
Amusement parks in Japan
Aquaria in Japan
Amusement parks opened in 2017
Buildings and structures in Nagoya
2017 establishments in Japan
Tourist attractions in Nagoya